Heidi Arnesen is a Norwegian orienteering competitor. She received a silver medal in the relay event at the 1991 World Orienteering Championships in Mariánské Lázně, together with Hanne Sandstad, Ragnhild Bratberg and  Ragnhild Bente Andersen.

National championships
Arnesen became Norwegian champion (relay event) in 1985 with her club OL Trollelg. She was Norwegian junior champion in night orienteering in 1986.

References

Year of birth missing (living people)
Living people
Norwegian orienteers
Female orienteers
Foot orienteers
World Orienteering Championships medalists
20th-century Norwegian women